The 1999 IIHF World Championship was held in Oslo, Hamar and Lillehammer in Norway from 1 to 16 May.  It was the top tier of the men's championships for that year.

Venues

World Championship Group A

Qualifying round 
Three qualifying tournaments were played to establish the last five entrants to the World Championship.  Two groups of four played in Europe, first and second place from each advanced, while the others were relegated to Group B.  The winner of the "Far East" tournament advanced to the World Championship, while the losers played in Group C.

Group 1 (Austria) 
Played 5–8 November 1998 in Klagenfurt.

The United States and Austria advanced to the World Championship.

Group 2 (Slovenia) 
Played 5–8 November 1998 in Ljubljana.

Ukraine and France advanced to the World Championship.

Far East (Japan) 
Played 4–6 September 1998 in Tokyo.

Japan advanced to the World Championship.

First round 
In each group, the top two nations advanced to the next round.  Third place teams played a final round against each other to determine who escaped having to qualify for next year's tournament.  Fourth place teams did not play further, they were automatically entered in qualifiers for next year's tournament.

Group 1 

Italy was relegated to the qualifiers for the 2000 IIHF World Championship.

Group 2 

France was relegated to the qualifiers for the 2000 IIHF World Championship.

Group 3

Japan was relegated to the qualifiers for the 2000 IIHF World Championship.

Group 4

Ukraine was relegated to the qualifiers for the 2000 IIHF World Championship.

Second round

Group 5

Group 6

Final Round
Each playoff match up consisted of a two-game series. If tied, the two teams would play an overtime-style mini game (10 minutes in duration for the semi-finals and 20 minutes in the final) to determine the winner, and then a shoot-out if no scoring occurred. The only mini-game to go to a shoot-out was the Czech versus Canada tiebreaker, with a 4 to 3 Czech victory. Note that the mini-games show up as a game played in the players statistics. The exception was for the bronze medal game which was just one game.

Semifinals

Match for third place

Final

Consolation round 9–12 place

Latvia and Norway were relegated to the qualifiers for the 2000 IIHF World Championship.

Ranking and statistics

Tournament awards
Best players selected by the directorate:
Best Goaltender:       Tommy Salo
Best Defenceman:       František Kučera
Best Forward:          Saku Koivu
Most Valuable Player:  Teemu Selänne
Media All-Star Team:
Goaltender:  Tommy Salo
Defence:  Jere Karalahti,  Pavel Kubina
Forwards:  Saku Koivu,  Martin Ručinský,  Teemu Selänne

Final standings
The final standings of the tournament according to IIHF:

Places eleven through sixteen had to play in qualifying tournaments for entry into the 2000 tournament.

Scoring leaders
List shows the top skaters sorted by points, then goals.
Source:

Leading goaltenders
Only the top five goaltenders, based on save percentage, who have played 40% of their team's minutes are included in this list.
Source:

See also
 1999 World Junior Ice Hockey Championships
 1999 IIHF Women's World Championship

Citations

References
Complete results

Archive of Norway 1999

 
IIHF World Championship
Men's World Ice Hockey Championships
1
I
1999
May 1999 sports events in Europe
1990s in Oslo
International sports competitions in Oslo
Sport in Lillehammer
Sport in Hamar